Wayne R. Mass (March 11, 1946 – July 4, 2019) was an American football offensive tackle who played five seasons in the National Football League with the Chicago Bears, Miami Dolphins, New England Patriots and Philadelphia Eagles. He was drafted by the Chicago Bears in the fourth round of the 1968 NFL Draft. He played college football at Clemson University and attended Edmunds High School in Sumter, South Carolina. He died of a heart attack in 2019.

References

External links
Just Sports Stats

2019 deaths
1946 births
Players of American football from New Mexico
American football offensive tackles
Clemson Tigers football players
Chicago Bears players
Miami Dolphins players
New England Patriots players
Philadelphia Eagles players
People from Portales, New Mexico